This is a list of the Croatia national under-21 football team results from 2000 to 2009.

Croatia failed to qualify for the European Championships until the 2019 Euro, its third Euro in total, where it was eliminated in the group stage.

Key 

Match outcomes

As per statistical convention in football, matches decided in extra time are counted as wins and losses, while matches decided by penalty shoot-outs are counted as draws.

By year

2010

2011

2012

2013

2014

2015

2016

2017

2018

2019

Record per opponent 

2010s in Croatia
Croatia national under-21 football team